Henry of Opole (– ), was a Duke of Opole from 1356 until his death.

He was the third and youngest son of Duke Bolko II of Opole and his wife Elisabeth, daughter of Duke Bernard of Świdnica.

Life
Little is known about his life. As the youngest child he was destined to a church life. During his father's lifetime Henry was chosen Canon of the Cathedral of Wrocław.

After the death of Duke Bolko II in 1356, Henry and his brothers Władysław Opolczyk and Bolko III inherited Opole as co-rulers; however, his rule was only a formal one.

Around 1356 Henry began his efforts to obtain the Canonry of the Cathedral of Prague. This is the last information of him as a living person, and probably he died soon afterwards. Although some historians put the date of his death not until 1365. The place of his burial is unknown.

References

Genealogical database by Herbert Stoyan
Genealogy of the Dukes of Opole

 
 

1330s births
1360s deaths
Piast dynasty
Dukes of Opole